A referendum on merging the posts of Chancellor and President was held in Nazi Germany on 19 August 1934, seventeen days after the death of President Paul von Hindenburg. The German leadership sought to gain approval for Adolf Hitler's assumption of supreme power. The referendum was associated with widespread intimidation of voters, and Hitler used the resultant large "yes" vote to claim public support for his activities as the de facto head of state of Germany. In fact, he had assumed these offices and powers immediately upon Hindenburg's death and used the referendum to legitimise that move and take the title  (Führer and Reich Chancellor).

Background
Hitler had known as early as April 1934 that Hindenburg would likely be dead by the end of the year. He spent much of the runup working to get the armed forces to support him as Hindenburg's successor. Hitler was aware that with the passage of the Enabling Act and the banning of parties other than the Nazis in 1933, Hindenburg was the only check on his power, through his right to dismiss Hitler from office. This fact was brought home earlier in 1934. In the wake of escalating Nazi excesses, Hindenburg threatened to declare martial law unless Hitler took immediate steps to end the tension. Hitler responded by ordering the Night of the Long Knives, in which several SA leaders, most notably Ernst Röhm, were murdered along with several of Hitler's other past rivals.

On 1 August, with Hindenburg's death imminent, Hitler had the cabinet pass the "Law Concerning the Highest State Office of the Reich", which merged the offices of president (head of state) and chancellor (head of government) under the title of Leader and Chancellor (Führer und Reichskanzler). Hindenburg died the following day, and two hours later, Hitler issued a decree announcing that in accordance with the new law, he had assumed the president's powers. He publicly argued that the presidency had become so linked with Hindenburg that the title should not be used again.

Immediately after Hindenburg's death on 2 August, defence minister and commander-in-chief Werner von Blomberg ordered all members of the Reichswehr (armed forces) to take an oath to Hitler.

When Hindenburg dictated his testament in May, he included as his "last wish" for Hitler to restore the Hohenzollern monarchy. His son, Oskar von Hindenburg, passed the testament on to Vice Chancellor Franz von Papen, who, in turn, gave it to Hitler on 14 August. The next day, 15 August, Hitler had it published without any indication of Hindenburg's "last wish".

Conduct

Voters were asked the question:
The office of the President of the Reich is unified with the office of the Chancellor. Consequently all former powers of the President of the Reich are transmitted to the Führer and Chancellor of the Reich Adolf Hitler. He himself nominates his substitute.
Do you, German man and German woman, approve of this regulation provided by this Law?

The government used widespread intimidation and electoral fraud to secure a large "yes" vote. This included stationing storm troopers at polling stations and forcing clubs and societies to march to polling stations escorted by Nazi storm troopers and then to vote in public. In some places, polling booths were removed, or banners reading "only traitors enter here" hung over the entrances to discourage secret voting. In addition, many ballot papers were premarked with "yes" votes, spoiled ballot papers were frequently counted as having been "yes" votes and many "no" votes were recorded to have been in favour of the referendum question. The extent of the fraud meant that in some areas, the number of votes recorded to have been cast was greater than the number of people able to vote.

However, the Nazis also made little effort to prevent either the casting or tabulation of negative or invalid votes in districts that were known to have large populations of Jews, Poles and other ethnic minorities. As was the case in the November 1933 elections, the first held after the Nazis seized full power, the leadership considered the expected unfavourable results in such areas to be useful in their propaganda as proof of disloyalty to the Reich. It was the last national vote in which Jews and other minorities were allowed to cast ballots before they were stripped of citizenship the following year by the enactment of the Nuremberg Laws.

The relative lack of support in Hamburg in 1933 prompted Hitler to declare a national holiday on 17 August 1934 so that he could address the German people directly over the 4.3 million registered radio sets.

The referendum itself, as well as all efforts to make Hitler head of state, violated the Enabling Act. Although it gave Hitler the right to pass laws that were contrary to the constitution, it stated that the president's powers were to remain "undisturbed", which has long been interpreted to forbid any attempt to tamper with the presidency. The constitution had also previously been amended in 1932 to make the president of the High Court of Justice, not the chancellor, first in the line of succession to the presidency and even then only on an interim basis until fresh elections.

Results
Support for merging the offices of president and chancellor was greatest in East Prussia, where official figures show that 96% voted in favour. Support was lowest in urban districts. It was least strong in Hamburg, where just under 80% voted affirmatively (20.4% against). In Aachen, 18.6% voted against. In Berlin, 18.5% of votes were negative and every district reported negative vote share greater than 10%. In the former Communist stronghold of Wedding, it was 19.7% against. The extent of the intimidation influenced the size of the "yes" vote. Overall support for the government was lower than in the referendum of 12 November 1933. Where the referendum of 1933 had received support from 89.9% of the total electorate, that of 1934 had only 84.3% support. The regional variation, however, was identical to that in the referendum of 1933.

Some in the Nazi leadership were disappointed by the results of the referendum. For instance, Joseph Goebbels' diary entry for 22 August speaks of the referendum as a failure: "Initial results: very bad. Then better. Finally over 38 million for the Führer. I expected more. The Catholics failed Rosenberg!" Nevertheless, historian Ian Kershaw has judged that even after accounting for the manipulation of the voting process, the results "reflected the fact that Hitler had the backing, much of it fervently enthusiastic, of the great majority of the German people" at the time.

References

Germany
1934 elections in Germany
Referendums in Germany
August 1934 events